William Beatty Pickett (born March 12, 1940) is an American historian and professor emeritus at Rose-Hulman Institute of Technology in Terre Haute, Indiana. He is known as an authority on President Dwight D. Eisenhower and Indiana Sen. Homer E. Capehart, and is the author of several well-regarded books on U.S. history including Dwight David Eisenhower and American Power and Eisenhower Decides To Run: Presidential Politics and Cold War Strategy.

Early life
Pickett was born in Crawfordsville, Indiana. He earned his bachelor's degree at Carleton College in Northfield, Minnesota in 1962, and both a master's degree (in 1968) and doctorate (in 1974) at Indiana University. He served as a lieutenant in the United States Naval Reserve from 1962 to 1966.

Academic career
After postgraduate work at Indiana University in the late 1960s, Pickett was a professor of history at Rose-Hulman for 35 years. He was a Fulbright Scholar at Nanzan University in Nagoya, Japan in 1989–90, lecturing on American history, and taught American history on U.S. military bases in Korea as a visiting professor for the University of Maryland. He was an educational consultant to the American University of Kyrgyzstan (now called American University of Central Asia) in 2002. In 1992–93, he served as president of the Indiana Association of Historians. In 2006, he co-founded the Web History Center, a hub for archiving and preserving early Internet history, with branches in Indiana at Rose-Hulman and at California's Computer History Museum. Two of his lectures about Eisenhower were featured on C-SPAN's Book TV series in 2000 and 2002. Since 2016, he has been a member of the historical advisory panel for the Eisenhower Memorial in Washington, D.C. Pickett retired from teaching in 2007 but continues to write.

Published works 
Over the course of his career, Pickett produced a number of books, journal articles, reviews, and oral histories.
Pickett wrote his doctoral thesis on Indiana Sen. Homer Capehart, and his 1990 book Homer E. Capehart: A Senator's Life was the first scholarly biography of the politician. Homer E. Capehart won an Award of Merit from the Ohio Museums Association in 1990.
Pickett's work on Eisenhower included two full-length books. Reviewer Lawrence S. Conner called 1995's Dwight David Eisenhower and American Power a "concise and readable" work that helped to revise previous historians' "harsh assessments of Eisenhower." Writing in Presidential Studies Quarterly, Herbert Parmet called the book a "gracefully written," more contemporary view of Eisenhower as a politician who "understood and moved with the rhythms of history." Pickett's 2000 book Eisenhower Decides to Run was one of the first scholarly looks at the 1952 presidential campaign, and focused particularly on Eisenhower's political reputation. Writing for Michigan State University's H-Net forum, Steven Wagner called the book "required reading for Eisenhower specialists" that helped to overturn the older consensus that Eisenhower was only a passive player in his own political career, and made the case that long-simmering political ambitions led to his consciously seeking the presidency in order to block the ambitions of Ohio Senator Robert A. Taft. Reviewer Thomas R. Maddux wrote that Pickett's book challenged the "standard view advanced by Stephen Ambrose and others" that Eisenhower was a reluctant candidate, positing instead that Eisenhower was cautious after witnessing the controversial political rise of his military rival Douglas MacArthur, and was a more skilled behind-the-scenes leader than generally acknowledged.

Pickett also conducted several collections of oral interviews on Capehart and the histories of Terre Haute and surrounding Vigo County and Rose-Hulman.

Selected publications

Books

Journal articles and short works

Oral histories

References

External links
Personal website
Web History Center website

1940 births
20th-century American historians
20th-century American male writers
21st-century American historians
21st-century American male writers
Academics from Indiana
American military historians
Cold War historians
Historians from Indiana
Historians of the United States
Living people
Political historians
Rose–Hulman Institute of Technology
Carleton College alumni
Indiana University alumni
American expatriates in Japan
American expatriates in South Korea
American expatriates in Kyrgyzstan
American male non-fiction writers
Fulbright alumni